Acracona is a genus of snout moths in the subfamily Galleriinae. It was described by Ferdinand Karsch in 1900, and is known from Uganda French Guinea, Togo and Madagascar.

Species
 Acracona elgonae Whalley, 1964
 Acracona lamottei (Marion, 1954)
 Acracona pratti (Kenrick, 1917)
 Acracona remipedalis Karsch, 1900

References

Galleriinae
Pyralidae genera